Miika Kirmula (born 12 December 1994) is a Finnish orienteering competitor, born in Vantaa. He competed at the 2019 World Orienteering Championships in Østfold, where placed 16th in the long distance, 7th in the middle final, and won a silver medal with the Finnish relay team. He won a gold medal in the middle distance at the 2014 Junior World Orienteering Championships.

References

1994 births
Living people
Sportspeople from Vantaa
Finnish orienteers
Male orienteers
Foot orienteers
Junior World Orienteering Championships medalists